Johanna Racer (1734 - 1822), was a Dutch merchant. Between 1764 and 1807, she managed the textile import company ‘Johanna Racer, wed. Tak’, which imported textile from India and were known as one of the most successful companies in contemporary Netherlands. She retired in 1807 and left it to her niece and name sake.

References 
Willemien Schenkeveld, Racer, Johanna, in: Digitaal Vrouwenlexicon van Nederland. URL: http://resources.huygens.knaw.nl/vrouwenlexicon/lemmata/data/racer [13/01/2014]

1734 births
1822 deaths
18th-century Dutch businesswomen
18th-century Dutch businesspeople
19th-century Dutch businesswomen
19th-century Dutch businesspeople